Zdeněk Vávra (25 September 1891 – 18 September 1947) was an Olympic épée, foil and sabre fencer who competed for Bohemia in 1912 and Czechoslovakia in 1920.

References

External links
 

1891 births
1947 deaths
Czech male épée fencers
Olympic fencers of Bohemia
Olympic fencers of Czechoslovakia
Fencers at the 1912 Summer Olympics
Fencers at the 1920 Summer Olympics
Czechoslovak male épée fencers
Czech male foil fencers
Czech male sabre fencers
Czechoslovak male sabre fencers
Czechoslovak male foil fencers